The Arboretum Sewer Trestle (also known as Arboretum Aqueduct, Arboretum Aqueduct and Sewer Trestle, or Wilcox Footbridge) is a historic multiarched concrete-and-brick trestle and footbridge in the Washington Park Arboretum in Seattle, Washington. It was listed on the National Register of Historic Places (NRHP) in 1982 (ID #82004229). It also has city landmark status, with ID #106070. As observed in a letter to the City Engineering Department in 1912, "The bridge is not an 'apurtenance of the sewer.' It is a piece of ornamental bridge architecture designed elaborately and is a very much greater thing than the sewer itself, in every way."

Accident
On April 16, 2008, a charter bus carrying the Garfield High School girls softball team crashed into the trestle, injuring a number of passengers and shearing off the bus's roof.

References

External links
 National Register of Historic Places entry

Sewerage infrastructure on the National Register of Historic Places
National Register of Historic Places in Seattle
Bridges on the National Register of Historic Places in Washington (state)
Bridges in Seattle
Concrete bridges in the United States
Trestle bridges in the United States
Bridges completed in 1910